Patrobus septentrionis is a species of ground beetle in the family Carabidae. It is found in Europe and Northern Asia (excluding China) and North America.

References

Further reading

 

Patrobus
Articles created by Qbugbot
Beetles described in 1828